Dominic Edward Gape (born 9 September 1994) is an English footballer who plays in central midfield for Wycombe Wanderers.

Career 
Born in Burton Bradstock, West Dorset, Gape joined Southampton when he was eight years old, first their academy before being promoted to the Development Squad. He captained the under-18 side in 2012–13.

Gape became part of the first-team squad in 2012, as an unused substitute in a League Cup match against Sheffield Wednesday on 25 September 2012. He signed his first professional contract in May 2013. His progress was then impeded by a series of illnesses and injuries, firstly by an ankle ligament injury and then a bout of glandular fever at the end of the 2013–14 season, before he broke a metatarsal in the summer of 2014.

He made his Premier League debut on 20 December 2014, as an 89th-minute substitute for Shane Long in a 3–0 victory over Everton.

On 31 August 2016, Gape moved on loan for the first time in his career; signing with League Two side Wycombe Wanderers until 3 January 2017. He scored his first goal for Wycombe in a 5–1 win over Crewe Alexandra on 27 September 2016.

On 7 January 2017, Gape permanently joined Wycombe Wanderers on a -year deal. He scored the winning goal in a 2–1 victory over Chesterfield on 28 April 2018, as Wycombe sealed automatic promotion to League One for the 2018–19 season.

In May 2019, he was offered a new contract by Wycombe.

Career statistics

Honours
Southampton 
U21 Premier League Cup: 2014–15

Wycombe Wanderers
EFL League One play-offs: 2020

References

External links

 Profile at Southampton F.C.

1994 births
Living people
People from West Dorset District
Footballers from Dorset
English footballers
Southampton F.C. players
Wycombe Wanderers F.C. players
Association football midfielders
Premier League players
English Football League players